The twelfth edition of the Caribbean Series (Serie del Caribe) was a baseball tournament held from February 10 through February 15, 1960 featuring the champion teams from Cuba (Cienfuegos), Panama (Marlboro), Puerto Rico (Caguas) and  Venezuela (Rapiños). The format consisted of 12 games, each team facing the other teams twice, and the games were played at Estadio Nacional of Panama City.

Summary
It was the final edition of the first stage of the CBWS, after MLB Commissioner Ford Frick banned American players from playing in Cuba for the 1960-61 winter season. As response, in March 1961 the Fidel Castro government would decree the abolition of professional sport in Cuba.  The Series would be suspended until 1970, reconstituting without Cuba and Panama, while adding the Dominican Republic. Cuba would return to the Series in 2014.

For the seventh time, and fifth consecutive year, Cuba won the CBWS championship with an undefeated record of 6-0. The Cuban team, managed by Tony Castaño, was led by a pitching staff anchored by big leaguers Camilo Pascual, who went 2-0 with 15 strikeouts including a one-hit shutout, and Pedro Ramos (one win, one save) and Orlando Peña (one win, one save). The offense was paced by outfielder George Altman, who co-led the series hitters with a .438 average, and first baseman Rogelio Alvarez (.333, two HR, .750 SLG, six runs, 10 RBI), second baseman Cookie Rojas (.429, one HR), OF Dan Dobbek (2 HR, .800 SLG) and OF Tony González (.429). Catcher Ray Noble and shortstop Leo Cárdenas also contributed in the defense.

Panama ended in second place with a 3-3 mark and was led by catcher/manager Wilmer Shantz. The team led the Series with 45 runs, powered by OF Eddie Napoleón, who shared the batting title with George Altman, as well 1B/OF Stan Palys (two HR, 12 RBI, 6 runs, .704 SLG), Héctor López (.370, 2 HR, 10 RBI, two stolen bases) and Lee Tate (eight runs, three doubles). Also in the roster were pitchers Bob Milo, Ken Rowe, Humberto Robinson and Robert Waltz, outfielder Joe Caffie and 1B Jim Gentile, who was injured at the start.

Puerto Rico, managed by first baseman Vic Power, finished third with a 2-4 record. The team led the tournament with 10 home runs but only scored 27 runs. OF Tommy Davis was named the Series Most Valuable Player after hitting .409 with three homers, six RBI, seven runs, two stolen bases,  and a .818 SLG%. Other contributions came from third baseman Woody Huyke (.350, one HR, .500 SLG), SS Félix Torres (3 HR), and OF/1B Orlando Cepeda (.333, .524 SLG, two SB). The team's two victories came from pitchers Earl Wilson (1-1, 15 strikeouts in 15 innings pitched)  and Juan Pizarro (1-1, 16 SO in 14 IP).

Venezuela was represented by the Occidental League champion as a late replacement after a players strike in the Venezuelan Professional Baseball League. The Rapiños team ended in last place with a 1-5 record and was managed by Les Moss. Venezuela's only victory came at expense of Puerto Rico behind a strong pitching effort by Ed Hobaugh. The starting rotation was depleted after Julián Ladera was injured, while Billy Muffett (0-2, 6.00 ERA) was a notable weak spot, even though he pitched a 12-inning complete game. The offense was guided by CF Willie Davis (.333, .593 SLG, two SB) and 3B Luis García (.333, one HR, .542 SLG). 2B Bob Aspromonte and SS Luis Aparicio provided a solid middle infield defense.

Scoreboards

Game 1, February 10

Game 2, February 10

Game 3, February 11

Game 4, February 11

Game 5, February 12

Game 6, February 12

Game 7, February 13

Game 8, February 13

Game 9, February 14

Game 10, February 14

Game 11, February 15

Game 12, February 15

See also
Ballplayers who have played in the Series

Notes

Sources
Antero Núñez, José. Series del Caribe. Jefferson, Caracas, Venezuela: Impresos Urbina, C.A., 1987.
Gutiérrez, Daniel. Enciclopedia del Béisbol en Venezuela – 1895-2006 . Caracas, Venezuela: Impresión Arte, C.A., 2007.

External links
Official site
Latino Baseball
Series del Caribe, Las (Spanish)
 

Caribbean
Caribbean Series
International baseball competitions hosted by Panama
Sports competitions in Panama City
1960 in Panamanian sport
1960 in Caribbean sport
Caribbean Series
20th century in Panama City